Piikani 147, formerly Peigan 147, is an Indian reserve of the Piikani Nation in Alberta. The Canada 2011 Census reported a population of 1,217 inhabitants. It is bordered by the Municipal District of Willow Creek No. 26 on its north and east, and by the Municipal District of Pincher Creek No. 9 on its west and south. The nearest outside communities are Fort Macleod and Pincher Creek.

External links
Map of Piikani 147 at Statcan

References 

Indian reserves in Alberta
Piikani Nation